Eckfeldt is a surname. Notable people with the surname include:

 Adam Eckfeldt (1769–1852), U.S. Mint worker and official
 Jacob R. Eckfeldt (1803–1872), American assayer

See also
 Ekfeldt